The piriformis muscle is a flat, pyramidally-shaped muscle in the gluteal region of the lower limbs. It is one of the six muscles in the lateral rotator group.

The piriformis muscle has its origin upon the front surface of the sacrum, and inserts onto the greater trochanter of the femur. Depending upon the given position of the leg, it acts either as external (lateral) rotator of the thigh or as abductor of the thigh. It is innervated by the piriformis nerve.

Structure

The piriformis is a flat muscle, and is pyramidal in shape.

Origin 
The piriformis muscle originates from the anterior (front) surface of the sacrum by three fleshy digitations attached to the second, third, and fourth sacral vertebra.

It also arises from the superior margin of the greater sciatic notch, the gluteal surface of the ilium (near the posterior inferior iliac spine), the sacroiliac joint capsule, and (sometimes) the sacrotuberous ligament (more specifically, the superior part of the pelvic surface of this ligament).

Insertion 
The muscle inserts onto the greater trochanter of the femur (its tendon often unites with the tendons of the superior gemellus, inferior gemellus, and obturator internus muscles prior to insertion).

Innervation 
The piriformis muscle is innervated by the piriformis nerve.

Relations 
The posterior aspect of the muscle lies againt the sacrum. The anterior surface of the muscle is related to the rectum (especially on the left side of the body), and the sacral plexus.

The muscle lies almost parallel with the posterior margin of the gluteus medius. It is situated partly within the pelvis against its posterior wall, and partly at the back of the hip joint.

It exits the pelvis through the greater sciatic foramen superior to the sacrospinous ligament.

Variation 
In around 80% of the population, the sciatic nerve travels below the piriformis muscle. In 17% of people, the piriformis muscle is pierced by parts or all of the sciatic nerve. Several variations occur, but the most common type of anomaly (81% of anomalies) is the Beaton's type B which is when the common peroneal nerve pierces the piriformis muscle.

It may be united with the gluteus medius, send fibers to the gluteus minimus, or receive fibers from the superior gemellus.

It may have one or two sacral attachments; or it may be inserted into the capsule of the hip joint.

Function
The piriformis muscle is part of the lateral rotators of the hip, along with the quadratus femoris, gemellus inferior, gemellus superior, obturator externus, and obturator internus. The piriformis laterally rotates the femur with hip extension and abducts the femur with hip flexion. Abduction of the flexed thigh is important in the action of walking because it shifts the body weight to the opposite side of the foot being lifted, which prevents falling. The action of the lateral rotators can be understood by crossing the legs to rest an ankle on the knee of the other leg. This causes the femur to rotate and point the knee laterally. The lateral rotators also oppose medial rotation by the gluteus medius and gluteus minimus. When the hip is flexed to 90 degrees, piriformis abducts the femur at the hip and reverses primary function, internally rotating the hip when the hip is flexed at 90 degrees or more.

Clinical significance

Piriformis syndrome occurs when the piriformis irritates the sciatic nerve, which comes into the gluteal region beneath the muscle, causing pain in the buttocks and referred pain along the sciatic nerve. This referred pain is known as sciatica. Seventeen percent of the population has their sciatic nerve coursing through the piriformis muscle. This subgroup of the population is predisposed to developing sciatica.
Sciatica can be described by pain, tingling, or numbness deep in the buttocks and along the sciatic nerve. Sitting down, stretching, climbing stairs, and performing squats usually increases pain. Diagnosing the syndrome is usually based on symptoms and on the physical exam. More testing, including MRIs, X-rays, and nerve conduction tests can be administered to exclude other possible diseases. If diagnosed with piriformis syndrome, the first treatment involves progressive stretching exercises, massage therapy (including neuromuscular therapy) and physical treatment. Corticosteroids can be injected into the piriformis muscle if pain continues. Findings suggest the possibility that Botulinum toxin type B may be of potential benefit in the treatment of pain attributed to piriformis syndrome. A more invasive, but sometimes necessary treatment involves surgical exploration; however, the side effects of the surgery could be much worse than alternative treatments such as physical therapy. Surgery should always be a last resort.

Landmark
The piriformis is a very important landmark in the gluteal region. As it travels through the greater sciatic foramen, it effectively divides it into an inferior and superior part.

This determines the name of the vessels and nerves in this region – the nerve and vessels that emerge superior to the piriformis are the superior gluteal nerve and superior gluteal vessels. Inferiorly, it is the same, and the sciatic nerve also travels inferiorly to the piriformis.

History 
The piriformis muscle was first named by Adriaan van den Spiegel, a professor from the University of Padua in the 16th century.

Additional images

References

External links 
"Piriformis" University of Washington
 - "Gluteal Region: Muscles"
 - "The Female Pelvis: The Posterolateral Pelvic Wall"

Hip muscles
Hip lateral rotators
Deep lateral rotators of the hip
Muscles of the lower limb